The 1998–99 Divizia D was the 57th season of the Liga IV, the fourth tier of the Romanian football league system. The champions of each county association promoted to Divizia C without promotion play-off.

County leagues

Harghita County

Hunedoara County

Mureș County

Neamț County

Vâlcea County

See also 
 1998–99 Divizia A
 1998–99 Divizia B

References

External links
 FRF

Liga IV seasons
4
Romania